Driss Benzekri (born 31 December 1970) is a retired Moroccan football goalkeeper who played most of his career at RS Settat. He played for the Morocco national football team and was the starting goalkeeper of the national team during the 1998 FIFA World Cup.

References

1970 births
Moroccan footballers
Morocco international footballers
Living people
1998 FIFA World Cup players
1998 African Cup of Nations players
2002 African Cup of Nations players
Association football goalkeepers
Botola players
Ittihad Khemisset players